The Uniopolis Town Hall is a historic village hall and museum in Uniopolis, Ohio, United States.  Built in 1875, this Gothic Revival structure was built as a church, the Divinity Church of the United Brethren in Christ.  The building ceased to be used for this purpose in 1900, when it was purchased by the village of Uniopolis and converted into a village hall.  After more than ninety years of service as a village hall, the building began a process of conversion into the museum of the Uniopolis Historical Society.

The Uniopolis Town Hall is a simple Carpenter Gothic structure with five lancet windows on each side.  Its weatherboarded walls rest upon a foundation of concrete and are topped with a roof of asphalt.  As the Uniopolis municipal building, it has served a range of non-governmental purposes, including use as a community meeting room and as an auditorium.  In recognition of its importance to the community, the village hall was listed on the National Register of Historic Places in 1994.  Although it was built in 1875, its primary use as a community building means that its period of historic significance was deemed to have begun in 1900.

References

External links

 Auglaize and Mercer Counties Convention Visitors Bureau: Museums

Government buildings completed in 1875
Churches completed in 1875
19th-century Protestant churches
Carpenter Gothic church buildings in Ohio
City and town halls in Ohio
Former churches in Ohio
Historical society museums in Ohio
Museums in Auglaize County, Ohio
National Register of Historic Places in Auglaize County, Ohio
City and town halls on the National Register of Historic Places in Ohio
1875 establishments in Ohio